Elizabeth Sheridan may refer to:

 Betsy Sheridan, writer and sister of Richard Brinsley Sheridan
 Elizabeth Ann Linley, singer and spouse of Richard Brinsley Sheridan
 Liz Sheridan, American actress in television and film